Electric fishing can refer to one of two methods of fishing:
Electrofishing, used to draw fish to an anode to be captured
Electric pulse fishing, where an electric pulse is generated above the sea bed to disturb fish to be captured